Jackpot is a 2006 Kannada romantic-drama film directed by Niranjan featuring Dhyan, Harsha and Shubha Poonja in the lead roles. The film released on 14 July 2006. It received mixed reviews. Aindrita Ray was also seen in a song in this movie.

Cast
 Dhyan as Raja
 Harsha as Ramesh
 Shubha Poonja as Preethi
 Antara Biswas as Laila
 Raju Ananthaswamy
 Sadhu Kokila as Black Magician
 Vaijanath Biradar
 Sudeep (Guest appearance)
 Daisy Bopanna (Guest appearance)
 Sunil Raoh (Guest appearance)
 Sanjjanaa Galrani (Guest appearance)
 Aindrita Ray (Guest appearance)

Soundtrack
The film features background score and soundtrack composed by Alwin, Krupakar, Hameed and lyrics by V. Manohar, Krupakar, Ram Narayan.

References

External links
 

2006 films
2000s Kannada-language films